Beverly Smith is a writer and academic.

Beverley Smith may also refer to:

Bev Smith (born 1960), Canadian basketball player and coach
Bevy Smith (born 1966), American television personality and business woman
Beverly Smith (softball), American softball coach
 J. Beverley Smith (born 1931), historian of medieval Wales